The WTA 125K series is the secondary professional tennis circuit organised by the Women's Tennis Association. The 2016 WTA 125K series calendar consists of eight tournaments, each with a total prize fund of $125,000. After 2015, the Nanchang event was upgraded to a WTA International level tournament, and with new events starting in San Antonio, West Hempstead and Bol. The planned tournament in West Hempstead was then cancelled, and the tournament scheduled to take place in Carlsbad, California was moved to Oahu, Hawaii. Following the death of the Thai king Bhumibol Abdulyadej, the event due to take place in Hua Hin was also cancelled, in accordance with Thai tradition that sporting events cannot take place in the month after a monarch's death.

Schedule

Statistical information 
These tables present the number of singles (S) and doubles (D) titles won by each player and each nation during the season. The players/nations are sorted by: 1) total number of titles (a doubles title won by two players representing the same nation counts as only one win for the nation); 2) a singles > doubles hierarchy; 3) alphabetical order (by family names for players).

To avoid confusion and double counting, these tables should be updated only after an event is completed.

Titles won by player

Titles won by nation

Points distribution

References 

 
2016 in tennis
2016